Anatoli Vasilievich Firsov (1 February 1941 – 24 July 2000) was a Russian ice hockey left wing and center, who competed internationally for the USSR. In the IIHF World Championships, he won the scoring title four times and was named the best forward three times. He was also named the most valuable player in the Soviet hockey league three times. Between 1964 and 1972, Firsov played 166 games for the national team. He scored 134 goals, and won three Olympic and eight world titles.

Firsov played in HC CSKA Moscow. He eventually would become one of the best forwards in Soviet hockey. Despite this he would not participate in the 1972 Summit Series against Canada. Many believe this was a result of Anatoli Tarasov's exclusion from the coaching staff.

In 1972, while still playing for CSKA Moscow, Firsov began working as an assistant coach for the club. Between 1976 and 77 he was the head coach of the Soviet junior team, which won a bronze medal at the 1977 World Championship. From 1977 and until his death he worked as a children's hockey coach. In 1989, Firsov was elected to the Congress of People's Deputies, running on a policy of improving health conditions and sporting facilities. In 1998, he was inducted to the IIHF Hall of Fame. Firsov died in 2000 at the age of 59.

Early life
Firsov was born and raised in Moscow on February 1, 1941. The family consisted of three children. When Firsov was only one month old, his father was killed in action during World War II and thus, he was raised by a single mother. Growing up, Firsov's family experienced economic hardship. His mother worked at a kindergarten which was not a well paying job. Initially, Firsov did not play ice hockey. Instead, he played bandy which was more popular than ice hockey at the time in the Soviet Union. The two sports share many similarities. One of the biggest differences between bandy and ice hockey is that the former uses a ball while the latter uses a puck. Firsov first played bandy as a member of his backyard team. He was initially slotted in as a defenceman, a position that was usually reserved for undersized kids and kids with no equipment. During the summer, Firsov would play football which helped keep him in shape all year long. Due to the lack of money in the family, Firsov had to make his own stick and skates. His stick consisted of a shaft carved from a cherry tree and the blade of his stick was made from shaft bows which he acquired by stealing from horse yards at night. The sticks broke easily and Firsov had to make new ones regularly. Meanwhile, his skates were composed of a boot with a blade laced at the bottom with a string. Despite these setbacks, Firsov quickly became considered as one of the best young talents. At around 11 years old, he was playing against 16 year olds and at around 12 years old, he was playing against men that had served in the Army.

It was not until Firsov was around 15 years old, that he learned about ice hockey. Firsov had a little difficulty with the different equipment at the beginning. Bandy sticks had a smaller blade compared to hockey sticks and Firsov felt that the larger blade interfered a little. However, Firsov credits the larger bandy fields for strengthening his endurance as he had to skate longer distances because bandy fields would be approximately 100m in length compared to hockey's 60m in length.

Awards
 Soviet MVP: 1968, 1969, and 1971
 Soviet scoring champion:  1966
 Soviet goal-scoring leader:  1966
 IIHF World Championships scoring leader:  1967, 1968, 1969, 1971
 IIHF World Championships goal-scoring leader:  1967, 1968, 1969, 1971
 IIHF World Championships best forward:  1967, 1968, 1971
 Order of the Red Banner of Labour (1972)
 two Orders of the Badge of Honor (1965 and 1968)

Bibliography

References

External links

 Anatoli Firsov at CCCP International
 

1941 births
2000 deaths
Communist Party of the Soviet Union members
HC CSKA Moscow players
HC Spartak Moscow players
Honoured Masters of Sport of the USSR
Ice hockey players at the 1964 Winter Olympics
Ice hockey players at the 1968 Winter Olympics
Ice hockey players at the 1972 Winter Olympics
IIHF Hall of Fame inductees
Medalists at the 1964 Winter Olympics
Medalists at the 1972 Winter Olympics
Medalists at the 1968 Winter Olympics
Members of the Congress of People's Deputies of the Soviet Union
Olympic ice hockey players of the Soviet Union
Olympic gold medalists for the Soviet Union
Olympic medalists in ice hockey
Ice hockey people from Moscow
Soviet ice hockey left wingers